Tomáš Drahovský  (born 7 October 1992) is a Slovak futsal player who plays as a universal for Industrias Santa Coloma and the Slovakia national team.

Honours

In June 2021, Drahovský became the top scorer of Spanish Primera División de Futsal for 2020-21 season with 29 goals in 32 games.

In June 2021, became the best winger of Spanish League Primera Division de Futsal for 2020-21 season

In 2020, Drahovský was rated 6th time (2014-2019) as a Best Slovak Futsal player

Top scorer of Slovakian futsal league 2014-2015 (40 goals in 26 games)

Club
Slov-Matic Bratislava
Slovak Futsal Extraliga: 2011–12, 2012–13, 2013–14, 2014-15

ETO Györ
Nemzeti Bajnokság I: 2015–16, 2016–17

Sparta Praha
Czech Futsal First League: 2018-19, 2019–20

Industrias Santa Coloma
Primera División de Futsal Top Scorer: 2020-21

References
 https://www.rfef.es/futbol-sala/noticias/tomas-drahovsky-se-consagra-como-maximo-goleador-primera-rfef-futsal-2021

External links
UEFA profile
Slovakia national team profile

1992 births
Living people
Futsal forwards
People from Stará Ľubovňa
Sportspeople from the Prešov Region
Slovak men's futsal players